The South African Railways Class 15C 4-8-2 of 1925 was a steam locomotive.

In 1925, the South African Railways placed two American-built Class 15C steam locomotives with a 4-8-2 Mountain type wheel arrangement in service. Another ten locomotives were ordered and delivered a year later. In 1926, these locomotives were reclassified to Class 15CB.

Manufacturer
On 15 December 1924, following an official tour of investigation to the United States of America by G.E. Titren, the Superintendent Motive Power of the South African Railways (SAR), an order was placed with the Baldwin Locomotive Works (BLW) of Philadelphia for four experimental locomotives, two of which were of a 4-8-2 Mountain type wheel arrangement. These locomotives, both types specially designed for the long runs of the Union Limited (Johannesburg to Cape Town) and Union Express (Cape Town to Johannesburg) passenger trains, were delivered in 1925.

Characteristics
These locomotives conformed to SAR requirements as far as practicable, but also incorporated the latest American railway engineering practices. They introduced several features which were new to the SAR at the time, such as top feeds to the boiler, self-cleaning smokeboxes, Sellar's drifting valves, and grease lubrication to the coupled wheel axleboxes, crank pins and connecting rod big ends. Their fireboxes were equipped with flexible side stays and water siphon arch tubes to support the brick arch and to improve circulation.

The locomotives represented a considerable advance in power over the Classes 15, 15A and 15B. The boilers were equipped with three Coale pop type safety valves and a Schmidt type superheater. The locomotive's size quickly earned it the nickname Big Bill, while its contemporary Class 16D 4-6-2 Pacific type which arrived from the same builders in the same shipment was nicknamed Big Bertha.

The first two locomotives, designated Class 15C with engine numbers 2060 and 2061, were erected at the Salt River shops and put to work on the line from Cape Town to Touws River. They performed well, were comparatively trouble-free and were good steamers capable of handling a heavy load exceeding that of any other locomotive which had been employed on this section to date.

Because of the good results obtained from these two engines, an order was placed with Baldwin for another ten locomotives which were delivered in 1926, numbered in the range from 2062 to 2071. All these locomotives were delivered new with copper fireboxes, but once sufficient water treatment facilities were available to prevent problems with corrosion, these were gradually replaced with steel fireboxes as and when firebox replacement became necessary.

Reclassification

Shortly after being placed in service, the Class 15C's frames began to show evidence of cracking. A similar locomotive which differed mainly in the design of the frame under the firebox was then ordered from the American Locomotive Company (ALCO). When the 23 ALCO-built locomotives were placed in service in 1926 they were designated Class 15CA, with the "A" supposedly indicating the manufacturer ALCO rather than, as was usual SAR practice, a different version of an existing locomotive type.

The Class 15C was then, rather unnecessarily, reclassified to Class 15CB, with the "B" merely to indicate the manufacturer Baldwin and not, as was usual practice, a branchline locomotive.

Modifications

Retyring
This modification enabled these mixed traffic locomotives to handle the fastest mainline passenger trains.

When larger tyres were fitted, the old tyres were left in position and turned down on the wheel centres to serve as liners and the new tyres were then shrunk on over the liners. The practice of increasing the diameter of coupled wheels, wheel spacing and other considerations permitting, was begun by A.G. Watson during his term in office as Chief Mechanical Engineer (CME) and was continued by his successors. The reduction of tractive effort caused by the larger wheels was made up by increasing boiler pressures or by fitting larger cylinders or both, as required. This practice resulted in more mileage between heavy repairs, less cost-per-mile on repairs and locomotives capable of higher speeds.

Reboilering
Three of the Class 15CB and Class 15CA locomotives were reboilered during the early 1940s with new boilers numbered in the range from 9504 to 9506. These boilers were of similar dimensions to the originals but with a different tube arrangement, and were designed by Dr. M.M. Loubser, CME at the time. The reboilered locomotives were not reclassified.

Service

South African Railways
The locomotives gave good service and were justifiably popular with traffic, running and engineering staff alike. The introduction of these large engines along with their Class 16D Pacific type Big Bertha siblings resulted in a complete revision of traffic operation between Cape Town and Johannesburg.

They were later transferred to Bloemfontein, from where they worked south to Noupoort. Following electrification of the Eastern Transvaal mainline in the mid-1960s, commencing in December 1964 all twelve Class 15CBs were transferred to Greyville on the Natal System from where they were used on, amongst others, the night and day passenger trains to and from Empangeni on the North Coast line and on passenger trains to and from Kelso on the South Coast line. They were eventually evenly distributed between the Greyville, Stanger and Empangeni sheds. After their Natal service, they spent the rest of their SAR working lives in the Eastern and Western Transvaal. They were withdrawn from SAR service in 1976.

Industrial
Eleven Class 15CB locomotives were sold into industrial service in 1976, with only the first-built, no. 2060, being retained by the SAR for preservation. By the late 1980s at more than 60 years of age, eleven of the original twelve Class 15CB locomotives were still at work.
 Numbers 2061, 2065 and 2070 became South Witbank Coal Mine's numbers 3, 2 and 1 respectively.
 Numbers 2062 and 2067 went to Tweefontein United Collieries.
 Numbers 2063 and 2064 went to Dunn's Locomotive Works to be employed at Durban Navigation Collieries (Durnacol) in Natal. No. 2063 was subsequently resold to Rustenburg Platinum Mines, becoming their no. 5, and no. 2064 was resold to Tavistock Colliery, becoming their 
 Numbers 2066 and 2068 went to Tavistock Colliery, becoming their numbers 4 and 5 respectively.
 Numbers 2069 and 2071 went to Rustenburg Platinum Mines, becoming their numbers 3 and 4 respectively.

Preservation

Illustration
The main picture shows a Class 15C as delivered in 1925, while the following show two Class 15CB locomotives in industrial service after withdrawal from SAR service.

References

1840
4-8-2 locomotives
2D1 locomotives
Baldwin locomotives
Cape gauge railway locomotives
Railway locomotives introduced in 1925
1925 in South Africa
Scrapped locomotives